
Year 343 (CCCXLIII) was a common year starting on Saturday (link will display the full calendar) of the Julian calendar. At the time, it was known as the Year of the Consulship of Memmius and Romulus (or, less frequently, year 1096 Ab urbe condita). The denomination 343 for this year has been used since the early medieval period, when the Anno Domini calendar era became the prevalent method in Europe for naming years.

Events 
 By place 

 Roman Empire 
 The Western Roman Emperor Constans I is in Britain, possibly in a military campaign against the Picts and Scots. The last visit to Britain by a legitimate emperor.
 The Eastern Roman Emperor Constantius II campaigns in Adiabene, a vassal kingdom of Armenia (Persian Empire).

 By topic 

 Religion 
 Pope Julius I tries to unite the Western bishops against Arianism by convoking the Council of Serdika (later Sofia), which acknowledges the pope's supreme authority and grants him the right to judge cases involving the legal possession of episcopal sees, but only Western and Egyptian bishops attend, and Arianism remains strong.

Births 
 Fu Deng, Chinese emperor of the Di state Former Qin (d. 394)
 Jin Mudi, Chinese emperor of the Eastern Jin Dynasty (d. 361) 
 Xiao Wenshou (or Xiaoyi), Chinese empress dowager (d. 423)
 Xie Xuan, Chinese general of the Jin Dynasty (d. 388)

Deaths 
 December 6 – Saint Nicholas (or Santa Claus) (b. 270)
 Li Shou (or Wukao), Chinese emperor of Cheng Han (b. 300)

References